Tam Kung Temple is a Chinese temple located at Mile 1.5 of North Road in Sandakan, Sabah, Malaysia. The temple was established in 1894 by Hakka immigrants in Sandakan.

References

External links 
 

Chinese-Malaysian culture
Taoist temples in Malaysia
Buildings and structures in Sandakan
Tourist attractions in Sabah